Kumbh Karan is an Indian-animated television series broadcast by the Indian kids channel Pogo. The show was released on 1 June 2010. The show earned a budget of more than $300,000.

Plot 
The show centers on the adventures of Kumbh and Karan, two twin brothers who stay in the small colony of Ajab-Gajabpur. Kumbh is chubby, lazy, sleepy, and hungry, but awfully strong with a real soft heart. Karan, on the other hand, is an agile, sharp and better (looking) version of his twin. With their friend Tara, and Kumbh's pet porcupine Kaddu, the twins travel worldwide on various quests.

Characters 

 Kumbh is a plump cherubic 10-year-old boy. He's named after the mythic giant Kumbhkarna in the Ramayana who slept for six months straight and could be revived only with the aroma of food.
 As Kumbh's twin brother, Karan shares Kumbh's eyes, big ears, but the similarities ends there.
 7 year old, Tara is Kumbh and Karan's best friend in Ajab-Gajabpur.
 Kaddu is Kumbh's pet porcupine who loves food as much as Kumbh. He follows his master everywhere like a Siamese twin.
 Sardar is the reluctant Chief of Ajab-Gajabpur.
 Kabira is the trusted lieutenant of Sardar and he is the one who trains Kumbh and Karan in everyday archery and warfare.
 Dadi Maa is the motherly caretaker of the two boys.
 Super Chacha is the one who always creates interesting things.

Overseas
The cartoon was aired on Hiru TV, in Sri Lanka with the name "Kadiyay Thadiyay".

See also
List of Indian animated television series

References

2010 Indian television series debuts
Indian children's animated comedy television series
Pogo (TV channel) original programming
Animated television series about children